Language police may refer to:

 The Language Police, a book by Diane Ravitch
 Office québécois de la langue française, a government office also known as the "Quebec language police"
 Language commissioner (disambiguation)

See also
List of language regulators
Linguistic prescription
Linguistic purism
Political correctness